Augusto Almeida (born 15 April 1966) is a Portuguese judoka. He competed in the men's half-lightweight event at the 1992 Summer Olympics.

References

External links
 

1966 births
Living people
Portuguese male judoka
Olympic judoka of Portugal
Judoka at the 1992 Summer Olympics
Sportspeople from Porto